Eupalamides cyparissias is a moth in the Castniidae family. It is widespread in the Amazon basin including Peru, Colombia, Ecuador, Venezuela, Brazil, the Guianas, Suriname and north to Panama.

The wingspan is 140–180 mm.

The larvae have been recorded feeding on Elaeis guineensis, Cocos nucifera, Mauritia carana, Mauritiella peruviana, Astrocaryum murumuru and Astrocaryum javarense and are considered a major pest to economically important palm species. The larvae are 110–130 mm long. Early instars feed on the surface of the petiole, scratching the epidermis and then perforating the interior. They create sinuous tunnels with irregular borders. These interrupt the flow of water and nutrients, causing premature senescence of the flowers or fruits. Pupation takes place in a pupa with a length of 64–95 mm which is contained in a compact cocoon formed of fibers of the host plant.

Subspecies
Eupalamides cyparissias cyparissias (Trinidad, Guyana, Surinam, Panama)
Eupalamides cyparissias amazonensis (Houlbert, 1917) (Amazonas, Peru)
Eupalamides cyparissias conspicua (Rothschild, 1919) (Bolivia)
Eupalamides cyparissias paraensis (Lathy, 1922) (Brazil: Para)

References

Moths described in 1777
Castniidae
[Category:Moths of Suriname]]